Hans-Adam II (Johannes Adam Ferdinand Alois Josef Maria Marco d'Aviano Pius; born 14 February 1945) is the reigning Prince of Liechtenstein, since 1989. He is the son of Prince Franz Joseph II and his wife, Countess Georgina von Wilczek. He also bears the titles Duke of Troppau and Jägerndorf, and Count of Rietberg. Under his reign, a 2003 constitutional referendum expanded the powers of the Prince of Liechtenstein. In 2004, Hans-Adam transferred day-to-day governmental duties to his eldest son Hereditary Prince Alois as regent, like his father had granted him in 1984 to prepare him for the role.

Early life

He was born on 14 February 1945 in Zürich, Switzerland, as the eldest son of Prince Franz Joseph II and Princess Gina of Liechtenstein, with his godfather being Pope Pius XII. His father had succeeded as Prince of Liechtenstein in 1938 upon the death of his childless grand-uncle, Prince Franz I, and Hans-Adam was thus hereditary prince from birth.

In 1956, he entered the Schottengymnasium in Vienna. In 1960, he transferred to the Lyceum Alpinium Zuoz in Switzerland, earning a Swiss Matura and a German Abitur in 1965. He then worked as a bank trainee in London before enrolling at the University of St. Gallen to study business administration, graduating with a licentiate in 1969. He is fluent in English and French in addition to his native German. 

In 1984, Prince Franz Joseph II, while legally remaining head of state and retaining the title of sovereign prince, formally handed the power of making day-to-day governmental decisions to his eldest son as a way of beginning a dynastic transition to a new generation. Hans-Adam formally succeeded as Prince of Liechtenstein upon the death of his father on 13 November 1989.

Powers
A referendum to adopt Hans-Adam's revision of the Constitution of Liechtenstein to expand his powers passed in 2003. The prince had threatened to resign and leave the country if the referendum did not result in his favour.

On 15 August 2004, Hans-Adam formally handed the power of making day-to-day governmental decisions to his eldest son Hereditary Prince Alois as regent, as a way of beginning a dynastic transition to a new generation. Legally, Hans-Adam remains the head of state. Hans-Adam's father Franz Joseph II had similarly done so on 26 August 1984.

In a July 2012 referendum, the people of Liechtenstein overwhelmingly rejected a proposal to curtail the political power of the princely family. 
A few days before the vote, Hereditary Prince Alois announced he would veto any relaxing of the ban on abortion, also up for referendum. 76 per cent of those voting in the first referendum supported Alois' power to veto the outcome of future referendums. Legislators, who serve on a part-time basis, rose in the hereditary prince's defence on 23 May, voting 18 to 7 against the citizens' initiative.

Personal wealth
Hans-Adam II owns the banking group LGT, and as of 2003 had a family fortune of US$7.6 billion and a personal fortune of about US$4 billion, making him one of the world's richest heads of state, and Europe's wealthiest monarch. He owns an extensive art collection, much of which is displayed for the public at the Liechtenstein Museum in Vienna. As of July 2022, his net worth was estimated by Bloomberg Billionaires Index around US$6.20 billion, making him the 380th richest person on earth.

Personal life

On 30 July 1967, at St. Florin's in Vaduz, he married his second cousin once-removed Countess Marie Kinsky of Wchinitz and Tettau. They have four children: Hereditary Prince Alois, Prince Maximilian, Prince Constantin, and Princess Tatjana (also known after marriage as Tatjana von Lattorff). They remained married until her death on 21 August 2021, at the age of 81.

The Prince is an honorary member of K.D.St.V. Nordgau Prag Stuttgart, a Catholic students' fraternity that is a member of the Cartellverband der katholischen deutschen Studentenverbindungen.

The Prince donated $12 million in 2000 to found the Liechtenstein Institute on Self-Determination (LISD) at Princeton University's Princeton School of Public and International Affairs. In his childhood he joined the Pfadfinder und Pfadfinderinnen Liechtensteins in Vaduz. He is also a former member of the Viennese Scout Group "Wien 16-Schotten". He is a member of the World Scout Foundation.

Viewpoints and book
Hans-Adam has written the political treatise The State in the Third Millennium, which was published in late 2009. In it, he argues for the continued importance of the nation-state as a political actor. He makes the case for democracy as the best form of government, which he sees China and Russia as in transition towards, although the path will be difficult for these nations. He also declared his role in a princely family as something that has legitimacy only from the assent of the people. He stated that government should be limited to a small set of tasks and abilities, writing that people "have to free the state from all the unnecessary tasks and burdens with which it has been loaded during the last hundred years, which have distracted it from its two main tasks: maintenance of the rule of law and foreign policy". Hans-Adam is a friend of the German anarcho-capitalist economist Hans-Hermann Hoppe.

Hans-Adam wrote to the foreword to a Sourcebook, on Self-Determination and Self-Administration, which was edited by Wolfgang F. Danspeckgruber and Arthur Watts (1997), and in the Encyclopedia Princetoniensis.

Titles, styles and honours

Titles and styles
 14 February 1945 – 13 November 1989: His Serene Highness The Hereditary Prince of Liechtenstein
 13 November 1989 – present: His Serene Highness The Prince of Liechtenstein

The official title of the monarch is "Prince of Liechtenstein, Duke of Troppau and Jägerndorf, Count of Rietberg, Sovereign of the House of Liechtenstein" (German: Fürst von und zu Liechtenstein, Herzog von Troppau und Jägerndorf, Graf zu Rietberg, Regierer des Hauses von und zu Liechtenstein).

Honours and awards

Foreign
 Austria
  Austrian-Hungarian Imperial and Royal family: 1,305th Knight with Collar of the Order of the Golden Fleece
 : Grand Cross of the Decoration of Honour for Services to the Republic of Austria, Grand Star
  Bavarian Royal Family: Knight Grand Cross of the Order of Saint Hubert

Awards
 : Honorary degree of the University of Innsbruck
 : Honorary degree of the Babeș-Bolyai University

See also

Line of succession to the Liechtensteiner throne
List of monarchs of Liechtenstein
Prince of Liechtenstein Foundation
Princely Family of Liechtenstein

References

External links 

 
 2004: Royal power handover – Prince Alois says democracy still strong Real Audio sound file from the BBC.
 Interview with Peter Robinson of Uncommon Knowledge
 Web archive

1945 births
20th-century Roman Catholics
21st-century Roman Catholics
Knights of the Golden Fleece of Austria
Bailiffs Grand Cross of Honour and Devotion of the Sovereign Military Order of Malta
Liechtenstein Roman Catholics
Living people
Princes of Liechtenstein
Recipients of the Grand Star of the Decoration for Services to the Republic of Austria
University of St. Gallen alumni
Liechtenstein people of Polish descent
Liechtenstein billionaires